MIB is an international School of Business and Management located in Trieste. The school was founded in 1988 as a bridge institution between universities, research centers and the business world.

External links 
 Official website of MIB School of Management

Buildings and structures in Trieste
Educational institutions established in 1988
Education in Friuli-Venezia Giulia
1988 establishments in Italy